Sven Blummel (born 8 September 1996) is a Dutch professional footballer who plays as a winger for Eerste Divisie club MVV.

Club career

Early years
Blummel started playing youth football for hometown club RKSV Schijndel before joining the PSV youth academy in 2004. He returned to Schijndel in 2010 and progressed through various youth levels, before again moving to PSV to join their reserve team, Jong PSV, competing in the second-tier Eerste Divisie in 2015. He made his professional debut in the Eerste Divisie on 18 September 2015, replacing Suently Alberto in the 62nd minute of a 3–0 home loss to Sparta Rotterdam.

FC Den Bosch
In May 2017, Blummel joined FC Den Bosch on a two-year contract with an option for an additional season.

Fremad Amager
On 12 August 2019, Blummel joined Danish 1st Division club Fremad Amager. He made his debut for Fremad on 16 August in a 3–2 league loss at home against Nykøbing. On 25 August, he scored his first goal for the club, opening the score in an eventual 3–1 away loss in the league to HB Køge. Blummel made 15 appearances for Fremad, scoring twice, before returning to the Netherlands.

De Graafschap
Blummed returned to the Netherlands after four months in Denmark, joining Eerste Divisie club De Graafschap on a two-and-a-half-year deal on 31 December 2019. He made his debut for the club on 10 January 2020, replacing the injured Mo Hamdaoui in the 31st minute of a 2–1 home win over Jong FC Utrecht.

MVV
On 29 January 2021, he joined MVV. According to the conditions of the transfer, he was loaned until the end of the 2020–21 season, and then transferred permanently on a contract until 2023.

Career statistics

References

External links
Sven Blummel at PSV.nl
 

1996 births
Living people
People from Schijndel
Association football midfielders
Dutch footballers
Dutch expatriate footballers
Jong PSV players
FC Den Bosch players
Fremad Amager players
De Graafschap players
MVV Maastricht players
Eerste Divisie players
Danish 1st Division players
Dutch expatriate sportspeople in Denmark
Expatriate men's footballers in Denmark
Footballers from North Brabant